Imorona is a town and commune in Madagascar. It belongs to the district of Mananara Nord, which is a part of Analanjirofo Region. The population of the commune was estimated to be approximately 7,413 in 2018.

It is situated at the Route Nationale No.5 between Maroantsetra and Toamasina.

Nature
The Mananara-Nord National Park is near this city.

References and notes 

Populated places in Analanjirofo